Arsenal Football Club is a Mosotho football club based in Maseru.

Achievements
Lesotho Premier League: 3
1989, 1991, 1993

Lesotho Cup: 3
1989, 1991, 1998

Performance in CAF competitions
 African Cup of Champions Clubs: 3 appearances
1990: Second Round
1992: First Round
1994: First Round

CAF Cup: 1 appearances
1995 – Second Round

CAF Cup Winners' Cup: 3 appearances
1991 – withdrew in First Round
1993 – Second Round
1999 – Preliminary Round

References

Lesotho Premier League clubs
Organisations based in Maseru